The Dominican Republic women's national softball team is the national softball team of Dominican Republic. It is governed by Dominican Republic Softball Federation and takes part in international softball competitions.

The team competed at the 2002 ISF Women's World Championship in Saskatoon, Saskatchewan where they finished sixteenth. The team competed at the 2010 ISF Women's World Championship in Caracas, Venezuela where they finished thirteenth.

The team won the bronze medal at the softball tournament of the 2003 Pan American Games. The Dominican team won the gold medal at the softball tournament of the 2013 Bolivarian Games.

Results
 ISF Women's World Championship
 2002 - 16th
 2010 - 13th
 Pan American Games
 2003 - Bronze Medal
 Bolivarian Games
 2013 - Gold Medal

References

External links
 National Federation Website 
 International Softball Federation

Softball
Women's national softball teams
Softball in the Dominican Republic